Radical 153 or radical badger meaning "badger" or "legless insect" is one of the 20 Kangxi radicals (214 radicals in total) composed of 7 strokes.

In the Kangxi Dictionary, there are 140 characters (out of 49,030) to be found under this radical.

 is also the 162nd indexing component in the Table of Indexing Chinese Character Components predominantly adopted by Simplified Chinese dictionaries published in mainland China.

Evolution

Derived characters

Literature

External links

Unihan Database - U+8C78

153
162